Singer Lionel Richie has been honored with many awards and nominations. They include four Grammy Awards and an Academy Award for Best Original Song for "Say You, Say Me".

Academy Award

American Music Awards

BET Award

Billboard Music Award

BRIT Award

Goldene Kamera

Golden Globe Award

Grammy Award

MTV Video Music Award

NAACP Image Award

TV Land Award

Other Honors

References

Richie, Lionel
Awards